Addonizio is an Italian surname. Notable people with the surname include:

 Hugh Joseph Addonizio (1914–1981), American politician
 Kim Addonizio (born 1954), American poet and novelist

Italian-language surnames